is a 2006  horror film and the third and final installment of the One Missed Call franchise, written by franchise creator Yasushi Akimoto and directed by Manabu Asou.

Plot
High school student Pam hangs herself at school due to severe bullying from her classmates, but she is saved and committed to a hospital in a state of coma. Her friend, Asuka Matsuda, who is also bullied, plans to take revenge against their classmates, all of whom have gone to Busan, South Korea on a field trip. Using her computer, she clicks her class photo to place the cell phone curse. Her first victim is Azusa Kusunoki; Azusa receives a message accompanied by a photo showing her hanged. At Busan, Azusa is separated from her classmates in a busy marketplace and is killed when a noose drags and hangs her, with her spitting out a red candy afterwards. Teruya Mikami receives the message next, but now accompanied with the text "Death exempt by forwarding the message". He shrugs it off and goes to a restroom, but is killed when a loose telephone wire electrocutes him to death. More students start to receive the message, and they race to forward it to their friends, saving them at the cost of their friends' lives.

Asuka's close friend, Emiri Kusama, whose boyfriend, Ahn Jin-woo, is deaf, calls Asuka to stop her, to no avail. They learn that the curse came from Mimiko Mizunuma, a girl who died from asthma. Emiri reveals to Jin-woo that PAM is a nickname for Asuka to denote her status in their class (a diminutive of "Spam"), exposing the current Asuka as her impostor. She also reveals that Asuka became the target of bullying due to standing up for Emiri, who was originally the one bullied first. With Jin-woo's advice, Emiri apologizes to Asuka, awaking the real Asuka.

Realizing that the curse's source is Asuka's computer, Emiri and Jin-woo race to send mails to overload the computer's inbox, with help from their friends who spread the news through South Korea and Japan. While sending mails, Emiri's computer connects with Asuka's at the same time when Asuka comes back home. The two have a conversation, but when Emiri receives the cursed message, both are transported to different places in their school. Finding Asuka about to commit suicide with Mimiko, Emiri recalls their promise to visit the shore and offers herself to replace Asuka. Before Mimiko can do so, Asuka's computer is overloaded and the two are sent back to their previous places. While parting ways with Emiri, Jin-woo snatches her phone (which still has the curse), and forwards the message to himself. Afterwards, he is violently killed as Emiri watches in shock. Some time later, Asuka and Emiri, the latter having lost her ability to speak and walk due to all the events that occurred, visit the shore as promised.

Cast
 Maki Horikita as  / 
 Meisa Kuroki as 
 Jang Keun-suk as 
 Erika Asakura as 
 Yū Kamiwaki as 
 Rakuto Tochihara as 
 Kazuma Yamane as 
 Takashi Yamagata as 
 Mami Hashimoto as 
 Miho Amakawa as 
 Ayumi Takahashi as 
 Ryu Morioka as 
 Yuta Murakami as 
 Karen Oshima as 
 Yoshiko Noda as 
 Itsuji Itao as 
Additionally, Mariko Tsutsui and Sena Shimizu appear as Marie and Nanako Mizunuma, respectively, through archive footage from the first film.

Release
One Missed Call: Final was released on June 24, 2006 where it was distributed by Toho.

Critical reception
One Missed Call: Final has received positive reviews from critics. The review aggregator website Rotten Tomatoes reported a 58% approval rating. It is the second-highest-grossing film in the series after One Missed Call (2003).

Notes

References

External links
 
 
 One Missed Call Final review at SaruDama.com

2006 horror films
Japanese horror films
South Korean horror films
2000s Japanese-language films
Japanese Sign Language films
One Missed Call
South Korean ghost films
Japanese ghost films
South Korean supernatural horror films
Japanese supernatural horror films
Yasushi Akimoto
Films about bullying
South Korean films about revenge
Japanese films about revenge
Japanese sequel films
2006 films
Films set in Busan
2000s Japanese films
2000s South Korean films

ja:着信アリ#「着信アリFinal」